Iddhi (Pali; Sanskrit: rddhi) in Buddhism refers to "psychic powers", one of the six supranormal powers (abhijñā) attained by advanced meditation through the four dhyānas. The main sense of the word seems to be "potency".

List of iddhi powers

According to Bowker, there are eight iddhi powers:
 Replicate and project bodily images of oneself, 
 Make oneself invisible, 
 Pass through solid objects, 
 Sink into solid ground, 
 Walk on water, 
 Fly, 
 Touch the sun and moon with one's hand, 
 Ascend to the world of the god Brahmā in the highest heavens

According to the Iddhipada-vibhanga Sutta (SN 51.20)
 Having been one he becomes many; having been many he becomes one. 
 He appears. He vanishes. 
 He goes unimpeded through walls, ramparts, & mountains as if through space. 
 He dives in and out of the earth as if it were water. 
 He walks on water without sinking as if it were dry land. 
 Sitting crosslegged he flies through the air like a winged bird. 
 With his hand he touches & strokes even the sun & moon, so mighty & powerful. 
 He exercises influence with his body even as far as the Brahma worlds.

In the book Great Disciples of the Buddha by Nyanaponika Thera and Hellmuth Hecker, there are several additional powers described.
The Divine Eye (Clairvoyance)- this power allows one to see beings in other realms as well as see the future
The Divine Ear (Clairaudience)
Travel by Mind-Made Body (Astral Travel)
Travel with the Physical Body (to other realms)
Telekinesis (Supernormal Locomotion)
Flying
The power of Transformation
The ability to replicate one's body
Penetration of others' minds (Thought Reading)
Passing through solid objects
Diving in and out of the Earth as if through water
Walking on water
Touching the sun and the moon with one's fingers
Becoming invisible
Recollection of past lives (some would call this a power, some would call it true knowledge)

See also
 Abhijñā
 Bodhipakkhiyādhammā
 Buddhist paths to liberation
 Dhyāna in Buddhism
 Four Right Exertions
 Iddhipada
 Kevatta Sutta
 Levitation (paranormal)
 Miracles of Lord Buddha
 Samatha
 Vipassanā

References

Sources

External links
 Encyclopedia.com, Iddhi

Buddhist miracles
Buddhist philosophical concepts